Craig Dias is a Gaelic footballer who plays for the Kilmacud Crokes club and for the Dublin county team. He made his league debut for Dublin against Kerry at Croke Park in February 2012. He won the all-Ireland senior football championship with Dublin in 2011 as a squad member. Craig made his championship debut scoring two points against Louth in the quarter finals of the Leinster Senior Football Championship.

References

Living people
Dublin inter-county Gaelic footballers
Gaelic football backs
Kilmacud Crokes Gaelic footballers
Year of birth missing (living people)